One Glorious Day is a lost 1922 American silent fantasy comedy film directed by James Cruze and written by Barry Barringer and Walter Woods. The film stars Will Rogers, Lila Lee, Alan Hale, Sr., Johnny Fox, George Nichols, and Emily Rait. It was released on January 29, 1922, by Paramount Pictures.  Working titles included Ek, A Fighting Soul and Souls Before Birth. Forrest J. Ackerman, the publisher of Famous Monsters of Filmland magazine, credited this film as being the one that "created his lifelong interest in science fiction and horror".

The film was originally planned by Cruze, under the title The Melancholy Spirit, as a vehicle for the comic actor Roscoe "Fatty" Arbuckle, who contributed ideas to the project. However, during the initial planning stages, Arbuckle gave a party in San Francisco at which a young starlet died, and one of her friends told the authorities that Arbuckle had raped the woman. The police theorized that Arbuckle's extreme weight had ruptured the woman's bladder during the alleged assault. The subsequent scandal and Arbuckle's three trials for manslaughter forced him to drop out of the film, which was then re-titled and recast with Rogers in the Arbuckle role. (Arbuckle was later acquitted but his film career never recovered).

Plot
A disembodied spirit entity with a strange appearance and bulging eyes named "Ek" takes over the body of a meek psychical researcher, Professor Ezra Botts (Rogers), during an out-of-body experiment and proceeds to live it up while the researcher watches from limbo and tries to get back into his physical body and resume his life. Botts waits until the spirit collapses from exhaustion, then takes the opportunity to reinhabit his own body.

Cast
Will Rogers as Professor Ezra Botts
Lila Lee as Molly McIntyre
Alan Hale, Sr. as Ben Wadley
Johnny Fox as 'Ek' 
George Nichols as Pat Curran
Emily Rait as Mrs. McIntyre
Clarence Burton as Bert Snead

See also
Forrest J Ackerman

References

External links

 
 

1922 films
1920s English-language films
American fantasy comedy films
1920s fantasy comedy films
Paramount Pictures films
Films directed by James Cruze
American black-and-white films
Lost American films
American silent feature films
1922 lost films
Lost comedy films
1922 comedy films
1920s American films
Silent American comedy films